Stars Forever is the thirteenth studio album by Scottish musician Momus, released by Le Grand Magistery in 1999. The album has been described as part of Momus's "analog-baroque" phase.

Momus wrote thirty songs for Stars Forever, one about every person or group who commissioned a song at the price of $1,000. The funds raised went towards the costs incurred from a lawsuit against Momus by Wendy Carlos. "Patrons" include fellow musicians The Minus 5 and Keigo Oyamada, artist Jeff Koons, retail store Other Music, and record label Minty Fresh. The album also features the eight winners of a karaoke parody contest in which participants were invited by Momus to submit recordings of themselves singing over the karaoke instrumentals included on his previous album The Little Red Songbook (1998).

Track listing

References

1999 albums
Concept albums
Momus (musician) albums